Muuga Bay (or ) is bay in Harju County, Estonia. Muuga Bay is part of Ihasalu Bay. Area of Muuga Bay is 3366 ha.

Several islets are located on the bay, e.g. Lahesaar.

Muuga Harbour is located at the bay.

References

Bays of Estonia
Harju County